Vedborm is a small village or hamlet (depending on the definition) in the Borgholm Municipality of the island Öland, Sweden. Population (as of 2000): 63.

References 

Populated places in Borgholm Municipality
Öland